GURPS Aliens is a sourcebook for GURPS published in 1990.

Contents
GURPS Aliens is a complete sourcebook on extraterrestrials, intended for use with GURPS Space, GURPS Horror, or GURPS Supers.

GURPS Aliens is a GURPS supplement describing 28 alien races for use with GURPS Space, including the An Phar, "pig-like humanoids with a love of philosophy," the Banduch, "super-powerful psychic dinosaurs," and the Verms: "Their ambition is to eat the galaxy."

Aliens came out before the more successful Fantasy Folk. The supplemental rules forming about a third of the book  were largely outmoded by the revised edition of Supers.

Publication history
GURPS Aliens was written by Chris W. McCubbin with W.G. Armintrout, William A. Barton, Steve Jackson, Creede Lambard, and Sharleen Lambard, with a cover by Michael Whelan, and was published by Steve Jackson Games in 1990 as a 128-page book. GURPS Aliens requires the GURPS Basic Set to use. GURPS Aliens was one of several sourcebooks published to add to the background of the GURPS Space setting.

Reception
David L. Pulver reviewed GURPS Aliens for Challenge #49. Pulver comments in his conclusion: "GURPS Aliens''' imaginative array of extraterrestrial races coupled with its lucid organization makes it a pleasure to read and to use. I have no hesitation in giving it a whole-hearted recommendation, not only as an invaluable sourcebook for GURPS'', but as a useful source of ideas for any science-fiction RPG."

References

Aliens
Science fiction role-playing game supplements
Role-playing game supplements introduced in 1990